OS, O.S., Os, O's, or os may refer to:

Businesses 
 Ordnance Survey, national mapping agency of Great Britain
 Austrian Airlines (IATA code OS based on its original name: Österreichische Luftverkehrs AG)
 O.S. Engines, a Japanese manufacturer of model aircraft engines

Computing 
 Operating system, computer system software that manages the hardware and software of a computer
 Open source (disambiguation)
 OpenStack, a software platform for cloud computing

Entertainment 
 "Os" (Fringe), an episode of the television show Fringe
 Outlaw Star, a manga and anime series
 OS, opposite prompt or stage right in a theatre

Medicine 
 os, a bone
 os or ostium, a mouth or mouth-like opening
 external os, the external orifice of the uterus
 internal os, the internal orifice of the uterus
 per os, meaning "ingestion by mouth"
 os or ostium, the opening of a coronary artery
 O.S. or OS, oculus sinister, meaning "left eye" in general ophthalmologic or optometric usage, particularly  in eyeglass prescriptions (deprecated abbreviation)
 Ohtahara syndrome, a brain disorder
 Overall survival rate, a cancer survival statistic
 Oneiroid syndrome, a dreamlike fantastic delusional state

People 
 Alexander Os (born 1980), a Norwegian biathlete
 Os du Randt (born 1972), a South African rugby player
 Os Guinness (born 1941), an English author and social critic

Places

Norway 
 Os, Innlandet, a municipality in Innlandet county, Norway
 Os, Hordaland, a former municipality in Hordaland county, Norway
 Os, Østfold, a parish in Rakkestad municipality in Østfold county, Norway
 Os Church, a name for several churches in Norway

Poland 
 Oś, Kluczbork County, a village in Kluczbork County, Opole Voivodeship, Poland
 Osiedle (Os.), a Polish term used for housing subdivisions in Poland

Germany 
 Opavian Silesia or "Upper Silesia", a portion of Silesia in the German Empire that opted to remain in Germany's Weimar Republic and Nazi Germany until World War II.  After the War, it was divided between Czechoslovakia and Poland.

Other places 
 Os, Värnamo, a village in Värnamo Municipality, Småland province, Sweden
 OS, ICAO code for airports in Syria

Religion 
 Ōs, an Old English word denoting a god in Anglo-Saxon paganism, related to æsir
 O.S., Order of Santiago, a Spanish order dedicated to St James the Greater
 O.S., Order of Sikatuna, the national order of diplomatic merit of the Philippines

Science 
 Ocean Science (journal), an oceanographic journal
 Osmium, symbol Os, a chemical element

Sport 
 Ohio State Buckeyes, a group of collegiate teams representing The Ohio State University
 Os TF, a sports club in Os, Norway
 On-sight climbing, an ascent of a rock climbing route on the first attempt
 Baltimore Orioles, an American baseball team nicknamed "O's"
 Leyton Orient, an English football (soccer) team nicknamed "O's

Titles 
 Ordinary seaman, an unlicensed member of the deck department of a merchant ship
 Ordnance sergeant, an enlisted rank in the U.S. and Confederate armies during the American Civil War era
 Old Shirburnian, used by alumni of Sherborne School
 Old Stonyhurst, used by alumni of Stonyhurst College

Other uses 
 Ōs (rune) (ᚩ), a rune of the Anglo-Saxon fuþorc
 Old Style (O.S.) date, indicating use of an earlier calendar (in Anglophone countries, the Julian Calendar), as opposed to "N.S." (new style), usually indicating use of the Gregorian Calendar
 Ossetic language (ISO 639-1 abbreviation OS)
 Object sexuality, sexual attraction to inanimate objects
 Oral sex

See also 
 0S (disambiguation)
 ÖS (disambiguation)
 Oz (disambiguation)